Fuzhou Gezhi High School (pinyin: Fúzhōu Gézhì Zhōngxué), also referred to as Gezhi, is a comprehensive three-year public high school located in the centre of Fuzhou City at the north foot of Mount Yu, enrolling 1980 students in grades 10 through 12. The school, established by Justus Doolittle, an ABCFM missionary, in 1847, is one of the oldest high schools in China supported by a foreign church. Spanning over 33380 square meters, Gezhi has the second largest campus among all high schools in Fuzhou, after Fuzhou No.1 Middle School.

Curriculum

Credits are granted for most of the courses and are essential for the graduation of Gezhi students. Students in Grade 10 have to take all main courses including Chinese Literature, Mathematics, English, Chemistry, Physics, Biology, History, Geography, Politics and some of the subordinate courses including General Technology, Information Technology, Music, P.E and Fine Arts. As soon as they enter Grade 11, students can choose one subject between Physics and History, and two subjects from Chemistry, Biology, Politics and Geography. Once the choice is made, students will no longer have to earn credits for the opposite set of courses, and those three courses won't be in their National Higher Education Entrance Examination, or Gaokao. Also, at the end of Grade 10, students ranking among the top of the same grader will be selected into advanced experimental classes, which offer the most demanding courses at Gezhi.

A typical Gezhi student takes eight 45-minute classes a day, five days a week for 16 weeks a semester, 2 semesters a year. The exact numbers of school days each week and school weeks each semester may vary depending on the date of Chinese holidays every year.

Advanced Placement courses and Honor classes are not available at Fuzhou Gezhi High School.

Extracurricular activities

Clubs

Students participate in a variety of extracurricular activities in Fuzhou Gezhi High School, though it was not until the first semester of 2011 to 2012 that participation in these activities became required for all students. Since September, 2011, credits are granted for club activities including the following: 

Fuzhou Gezhi High School is famous for its orchestra and sports teams. Gezhi has the best high school table tennis players and basketball players in Fuzhou.
Gezhi is a member of Fujian Astronomy Society. The school, having one of the most advanced observatories in Fuzhou, is famous for its long history of astronomical observations and its frequent participation in local amateur activities. However, its astronomy society is sometimes blamed for its weak awareness of developments and frivolity in academic areas.

The student council

The student council was first established in the early 1990s but was cancelled around the year 1995. It was reformed in 2008 and currently has 12 departments/branches as follow:
The President
General Branch of the Communist Youth League of Fuzhou Gezhi High School
Department of Interscholastic Affairs
Department of Publicity
Department of Information Technology
Department of Athletics
Department of Labor and Discipline
The School Radio Station (The Sound of Gezhi)
The Press Corps
Department of Clubs
Department of Entertainment
Department of Organization
Department of Technical

Notable alumni

Chen Shaokuan, Commander-in-Chief of the Navy of the Republic of China, former Vice-Gonverner of Fujian Province, Class of 1932 (transferred to Jiangnan Institution of Navy in 1931)
Wang Shizhen, nuclear medical scientist, Class of 1933
Chen Yi, chemist, academician of Chinese Academy of Sciences, Class of 1951
Liu Yingming, mathematician, academician of Chinese Academy of Sciences, Class of 1954
Chen Jiansheng, astronomer, academician of Chinese Academy of Sciences, chief of a research group which discovered asteroid 55892 Fuzhougezhi, Class of 1957
Chen Jingming, geographer, academician of Chinese Academy of Science of the Royal Society of Canada, Class of 1974
Zhao Linbin, Vice-Principal of Minjiang University, Class of 1974
Xu Deqing, Professor at Harvard University, Class of 1979

Honors

Asteroid: 55892 Fuzhougezhi (1997 XQ5)

Campuses

Apart from the main campus of Fuzhou Gezhi High School in Gulou District, Fuzhou, Gezhi has a branch in Jin'an District, Fuzhou, which offers grade 7 through 12.
A New Campus in Baofu Road, Gulou District, Fuzhou came into use in September 2019, which is used as the junior high school department (offers grade 7 through 9) of Fuzhou Gezhi High School.
In June 2020, Gezhi took over Fuzhou No.22 Middle school, following an arrangement of the education authority of Fuzhou. The school is renamed as the Xihong Campus of Fuzhou Gezhi High School, offers grade 7 through 9.

External links

Official Website

High schools in Fujian
Schools in Fuzhou